O 6 was a unique patrol submarine of the Royal Netherlands Navy for European home waters. The ship was built by De Schelde shipyard in Flushing. The submarines diving depth was 40 metres.  was very similar to the O 6 and they are sometimes regarded as one class.

Service history
The submarine was ordered on 8 May 1913 and in May 1914 the O 6 was laid down in Flushing at the shipyard of De Schelde. The launch took place on 10 June 1915.

On 5 December 1916 the ship was commissioned in the navy. During World War I the ship was based in Den Helder.

On 7 Jul 1920 the ship left the port of Flushing for a trip to Norway the ports of Odda, Bergen, Gudvangen among others are visited. The ship returned to Flushing in June 1920.

In June 1923 the O 6 was used by Professor  F.A. Vening Meinesz for gravity measurements in the North Sea. In November 1936 O 6 was decommissioned.

External links
Description of ship

References

Bibliography
 

1915 ships
Ships built in Vlissingen
Submarines of the Royal Netherlands Navy
Submarines built by Koninklijke Maatschappij De Schelde